James Masters (born 13 July 1982 in Cork, Ireland) is an Irish former Gaelic footballer who played for the Nemo Rangers club and at senior level for the Cork county team from 2005 until 2010.

Biography
James Masters was born in Cork in 1982.  He was educated locally at Coláiste Chríost Rí on the south side of the city.  It was here that he first came to prominence as a hurler and a footballer on various school teams.  In 2001 Masters was the star player for the coláiste when he scored nine points against St. Colman's College to win the county colleges' title.  He later studied at the Garda Síochána College in Templemore and currently works as a Garda in Crookstown.

Playing career

Club
Masters played his club hurling and football with the Nemo Rangers club in Cork. He joined the senior panel in the early 2000s; however, he had to wait several years before he would make a big impact, due to the presence of stalwarts Joe Kavanagh and Colin Corkery playing in his favoured position. In 2002 Nemo reached the final of the provincial club championship. Masters came on as a substitute in that game as the club trounced Monaleen of Limerick by 4–15 to 0–6. It was Masters's first Munster Senior Club Football Championship winners' medal. In spite of contributing to this victory he played no part in Nemo's subsequent All-Ireland Senior Club Football Championship triumph on St Patrick's Day, 2003.

Two years later in 2005 Masters had established himself on the full-forward line with Nemo. He won his first county senior championship title on the field of play that year as Muskerry were defeated by ten points. Masters later secured a second Munster club title; however, Nemo missed out on the ultimate success. In 2006 Nemo retained their county title with Masters securing a second county championship medal.  The club made it three-in-a-row in 2007 before claiming the Munster club title also. It was Masters's third winners' medal in the provincial series. The subsequent All-Ireland club final pitted Nemo against St. Vincent's of Dublin.  Unfortunately, Masters ended up on the losing side on that occasion.

In 2008 Nemo and Masters made it four county championship titles in-a-row.

Inter-county
Masters first came to prominence on the inter-county scene as a member of the Cork minor football team in 2000. That year, as captain of the team, he won a Munster winners' medal in that competition following a 1–13 ro 0–14 defeat of arch-rivals Kerry. Cork later qualified for the All-Ireland final, with Mayo providing the opposition. A close game followed; however, at the full-time whistle Cork were the champions by 2–12 to 0–13. Not only did Masters collect an All-Ireland minor winners' medal that day but he also had the honour of collecting the cup on behalf of his county.

By 2001 Masters was too old to play in the minor grade; however, he was an automatic choice for the Cork under-21 team. That year he won a Munster title in that grade following a 1–12 to 0–8 defeat of Limerick. Cork were subsequently defeated in the All-Ireland semi-final. Masters had no further success with the county under-21 footballers.

In 2005 Masters became a full member of the Cork senior football team. That year he lined out in his first Munster final. Reigning All-Ireland champions Kerry provided the opposition on that occasion; however, Cork were beaten by 1–11 to 0–11. Cork remained in the championship following this defeat; however, both Cork and Kerry later met again in the All-Ireland semi-final. That game turned into an absolute rout.  Kerry won easily by 1–19 to 0–9.

In 2006 Cork lined out against Kerry in the Munster final once again. That game ended in a 0–10 apiece draw. The replay saw a much fresher Cork team defeat Kerry by 1–12 to 0–9. Masters proved the hero of the day, as he scored 1–7. The quirks of the championship saw Cork face Kerry again in the subsequent All-Ireland semi-final. In a similar pattern to previous encounters Cork failed to beat Kerry at Croke Park. A 0–16 to 0–10 resulted in Masters's side being defeated.

In 2007 Cork narrowly lost their Munster crown to Kerry. In spite of the 1–15 to 1–13 defeat Cork still had another chance to claim the All-Ireland title. Cork later did well in the All-Ireland series and finally qualified for the championship decider. Kerry, however, were the opponents. While the first half was played on an even keel, 'the Kingdom' ran riot in the second half and a rout ensued. At the full-time whistle Cork were trounced by 3–13 to 1–9.

In 2008 Cork gained a modicum of revenge on Kerry when sides met in the Munster final. Kerry were cruising by eight points at the interval; however, Cork stormed back in the second-half. Kerry could only muster three points as Cork secured a 1–16 to 1–11 victory. It was Masters's second Munster winners' medal. Both sides met again in the All-Ireland semi-final; however, after a thrilling draw and a replay Kerry were the team that advanced to the championship decider.

In 2009 Cork defeated Kerry in a replay of the provincial semi-final, thus securing a place for Masters's side in a fifth consecutive Munster final. Limerick provided the opposition on that occasion and, while many expected the game to be a foregone conclusion, Cork had to fight tooth-and-nail for every ball. For a while it looked as if Limerick would claim an historic victory; however, at the full-time whistle Cork got out of jail and won by just a single point. It was Masters's third Munster Senior Football Championship winners' medal.

Masters decided to withdraw from the Cork panel in March 2010 citing his lack of game time as the reason. Masters had become a more peripheral figure in the Cork set up throughout 2009 with the emergence of younger players such as Colm O'Neill reducing him to the role of a substitute.

Province
Masters also lined out with Munster in the inter-provincial football competition. He first played with his province in 2005; however, Munster were defeated by Ulster at the semi-final stage.

Career statistics

Club

Inter-county

Championship record

References

1982 births
Living people
Alumni of Garda Síochána College
Cork hurlers 
Cork inter-county Gaelic footballers
Dual players
Garda Síochána officers
Nemo Rangers Gaelic footballers
Nemo Rangers hurlers
Seandún hurlers
Munster inter-provincial Gaelic footballers
People educated at Coláiste Chríost Rí
Hurling goalkeepers